Gnaphalium depressum may refer to three different species of plants:

 Gnaphalium depressum Nutt., an unused synonym for Lucilia kunthiana
 Gnaphalium depressum Steud., an unused synonym for Helichrysum luteoalbum
 Gnaphalium depressum Roxb., an unused synonym for Gnomophalium pulvinatum